Joaquim Arcoverde de Albuquerque Cavalcanti (January 17, 1850 – April 18, 1930) was a Brazilian  prelate of the Catholic Church, who served as Archbishop of Rio de Janeiro from 1897 to 1930. He was made a cardinal in 1905, the first cardinal born in Latin America.

Biography

Early life and ministry
Arcoverde was born into a prominent family in Cimbres, province of Pernambuco, in the Northeast of Brazil. He showed an early vocation for the priesthood but the absence of local seminaries meant that he did all his studies prior to becoming a priest in Rome. However, after being ordained in 1874, Arcoverde returned to Olinda to become rector of the new seminary there. He was nominated a bishop by Pope Leo XIII in 1888 but refused; however, when Pope Leo, obviously believing very firmly in his ability, nominated him again three years later to the diocese of Goiás he accepted his nomination very willingly.

Archbishop
In 1897 Arcoverde was promoted to the archiepiscopal see of São Sebastião do Rio de Janeiro, then clearly the highest position on the Latin American Church. Pope Pius X made him a cardinal in his second consistory on December 11, 1905. He was the first cardinal born in Latin America. He was only the second cardinal to serve as ordinary of a diocese located in the Southern Hemisphere behind Francis Patrick Moran, the Irish-born Archbishop of Sydney who had been elevated in 1885. Arcoverde was the first cardinal to be born in the Southern Hemisphere.

He participated in the conclave in 1914 but did not attempt to reach Rome in time for the 1922 conclave, due to ill health.

Death
Arcoverde led the See of Rio de Janeiro for more than 30 years, until his death in 1930, although in his later years (from 1921 onwards), due to failing health, he was aided by a coadjutor archbishop. He died in Rio de Janeiro, then the Brazilian capital.

References

External links
 Biography

Brazilian cardinals
20th-century Roman Catholic archbishops in Brazil
19th-century Roman Catholic archbishops in Brazil
1850 births
1930 deaths
People from Pernambuco
Cavalcanti family
Cardinals created by Pope Pius X
Roman Catholic bishops of São Paulo
Roman Catholic archbishops of São Sebastião do Rio de Janeiro
Roman Catholic bishops of Goiás